This is a list of American television-related events in 1968.

Events

Other events and statistics in 1968
 The last round-screen color TV sets were produced by all American manufacturers.

Television programs

Debuts

Ending this year

Television specials

Networks and services

Network launches

Television stations

Sign-ons

Network affiliation changes

Station closures

Births

Deaths

References

External links
List of 1968 American television series at IMDb